Hidden Dam is an earthen dam on the Fresno River in Madera County, California. It creates a reservoir known as Hensley Lake.

The dam was constructed in 1974 by the Perini Corporation as part of an expansive United States Army Corps of Engineers project for flood control, irrigation storage, and recreation.  The dam is 184 feet tall, is 5730 feet long at its crest, and is the only major storage dam of the Fresno River.

The reservoir it creates, Hensley Lake, has a water surface of two and a half square miles, over twenty miles of shoreline, and has a maximum storage capacity of 90,000 acre-feet.  In 1978 the lake was opened to day-use recreation, including water skiing, fishing, swimming, horseback riding, mountain biking, and hiking.  The Hidden View Campground offers single and group camping year-round.

The lake is named for local settler and cattle rancher John Jackson Hensley.

Eastman Lake, another Corps of Engineers lake, is located 15 miles to the northwest.

See also 
 List of dams and reservoirs in California
 List of lakes in California

External links 
 U.S. Army Corps of Engineers - Hensley Lake
 Recreation at Hensley Lake (Recreation.gov)

References 

Dams in California
Reservoirs in Madera County, California
United States Army Corps of Engineers dams
Buildings and structures in Madera County, California
Earth-filled dams
Dams in the San Joaquin River basin
Reservoirs in California
Reservoirs in Northern California